The MAN CLA is a medium-to-heavy-duty class of truck developed in India and produced by the German vehicle manufacturer MAN Truck & Bus. It is based on the original MAN L2000 (LE2000/LE) series.

It was introduced to the Indian market in 2007. Most CLAs are exported to other countries in completely knock down form.

Specifications
The truck's exclusive option is a  six-cylinder turbocharged diesel engine. It was codenamed D0836, it rated outputs at 220-HP, 230-HP, 280-HP or 300-HP. Transmissions include a 6-speed manual or a 9-speed manual.

References 

 

CLA
Vehicles introduced in 2007